Jodi Hack is an American politician from Oregon. She was elected to the Oregon House of Representatives in 2014 in District 19, which covers parts of Salem. She originally sought an interim appointment to the seat after the resignation of Kevin Cameron in 2014, but Cameron's chief of staff Denyc Boles was appointed after confirming she would not run for a full term. Hack defeated Bill Dalton, the Democratic Party nominee, on November 4, 2014.

Hack previously worked as a spokeswoman and grantwriter for the North Santiam School District.

Hack resigned December 31, 2017 to become CEO of the Oregon Home Builders Association.

References

Living people
Republican Party members of the Oregon House of Representatives
Politicians from Salem, Oregon
Women state legislators in Oregon
Year of birth missing (living people)
Place of birth missing (living people)
21st-century American politicians
21st-century American women politicians